Paradise Mountain may refer to:

 Paradise Mountain (California) in California, USA 
 Paradise Mountain (Nevada) in Nevada, USA 
 Paradise Mountain (New Jersey) in New Jersey, USA
 Paradise Mountain (Oregon) in Oregon, USA 
 Paradise Mountain (Texas) in Texas, USA

See also
Paradise Peak (disambiguation)